The Evansville Review is a literary journal published annually by the University of Evansville. Content includes poetry, fiction, nonfiction, plays, and interviews by the students. It was founded in 1989. Notable past contributors include Joyce Carol Oates, Arthur Miller, John Updike, Joseph Brodsky, and Shirley Ann Grau, among others. Poems that first appeared in the Evansville Review have been included in the Best American Poetry and Pushcart Prize anthologies.

See also
 Willis Barnstone Translation Prize

References

External links
 

1989 establishments in Indiana
Annual magazines published in the United States
Magazines established in 1989
Magazines published in Indiana
Mass media in Evansville, Indiana
Poetry magazines published in the United States
Student magazines published in the United States
University of Evansville